Euthanasia in Canada in its legal voluntary form is called medical assistance in dying (MAID) and it first became legal along with assisted suicide in June 2016 to end the suffering of terminally ill adults. In March 2021, the law was further amended by Bill C-7 which permits assisted euthanasia in additional situations, including for certain patients whose natural death is not reasonably foreseeable, subject to additional safeguards. In 2021, more than 10,000 people died by euthanasia in Canada.

Bill C-14, passed by the Parliament of Canada in June 2016, amended the Canadian Criminal Code so as to legalize both physician-administered euthanasia (PAE) and physician-assisted suicide (PAS) and to govern access to both procedures in Canada. The bill disallowed for medically assisted death on the grounds of mental illness, long-term disability, or any curable condition and did not make euthanasia available to minors. Bill C-7 amended the law so as to allow for euthanasia because of mental illness.

To prevent suicide tourism, it is available only to residents eligible for Canadian healthcare coverage. Advance directives are allowed in Canada for euthanasia if their death is reasonably foreseeable and they are likely to lose the capacity to consent in the near future (such as in cases of dementia or Alzheimer's disease where patients may want to die after they reach an advanced state of mental decline).

Canada's euthanasia law includes legal safeguards aimed at preventing abuse and ensuring informed consent. Neither the legal witness nor the physicians involved can have any legal or financial interest in the outcomes of the patient. Consent must be repeatedly expressed, not implied, including in the moment right before death. Consent can be revoked at any time, in any manner. There are no consequences for backing out and there are no limits to how often it can be requested.

To receive euthanasia, patients experiencing intolerable suffering must sign a written request expressing their wish to end their life in front of one independent witness who can confirm it was done willingly free of coercion. Next, two physicians and/or nurse practitioners must independently confirm their written agreement that the patient has an incurable grievous and irremediable medical condition that is in an advanced state of irreversible decline, and that the patient is capable of receiving and willing to receive euthanasia. If their death is not reasonably foreseeable, a medical expert in the underlying medical condition must sign off on the request, their assessment must take at least 90 days, and they must be informed about and decline all other forms of treatment, including palliative care.

Euthanasia was previously prohibited under the Criminal Code as a form of culpable homicide. The prohibition was overturned in a February 2015 decision by the Supreme Court of Canada in Carter v. Canada (Attorney General), which ruled that adults with grievous and irremediable medical conditions are entitled to euthanasia. The Court delayed its suspension of invalidity for a period of 12 months, to allow Parliament the opportunity to amend its laws if it so chose. In January 2016, the Court granted an additional four-month extension to the suspension to allow for further time. As an interim measure, it ruled that provincial courts can now begin approving applications for euthanasia pursuant to the criteria in the Carter decision. On 6 June 2016, the suspension of invalidity expired and the law was struck down. On 17 June 2016, a bill to legalize and regulate euthanasia passed in Canada's Parliament.

The previous law's requirement that a natural death must be reasonably foreseeable and that the medical condition be grievous and irremediable medical condition had been controversial for how it limited the original Supreme Court of Canada ruling, mandating that euthanasia be made available to all adults with grievous and irremediable medical conditions. The British Columbia Civil Liberties Association (BCCLA) challenged the constitutionality of the previous law because it excluded people with long-term disabilities and those with "curable" medical conditions whose only treatment options people may find unacceptable. The BCCLA argued these medical conditions should qualify under the court's definition of grievous and irremediable. The BC Supreme Court and the Quebec Supreme court in Truchon ruled in 2019 that the law could not limit euthanasia only to individuals whose death was reasonably foreseeable.

The current law prohibits mental illnesses as being considered as a grievous and irremediable condition, but this prohibition is set to expire on 17 March 2023. On February 2, 2023, the Government of Canada introduced legislation to extend the temporary exclusion of eligibility in circumstances where a person's sole underlying medical condition is a mental illness for a period of one-year, until 17 March 2024. After this date, persons with a mental illness will be eligible for medical assistance in dying, subject to any further amendments to the law or any new regulations.

Canada's euthanasia laws have been the subject of substantial international attention and criticism. Human rights advocates have criticized Canada's euthanasia laws for lacking safeguards, devaluing the lives of disabled people, prompting health workers and doctors to suggest euthanasia to people who would not otherwise consider it, and killing people who were not receiving adequate government support to continue living.

Intravenous Protocol 
The patient must give written consent to receiving euthanasia at the time of the procedure. The patient is also given the opportunity to rescind verbally their request for euthanasia immediately prior to the procedure taking place.

IV Drugs 
A lethal dose of propofol is used for euthanasia in Canada to quickly induce deep coma and death, but rocuronium is always given—even when patient dies as a result of Propofol injection. Delivery order of IV medication is as follows, with saline flushes between medications:

Step 1: Midazolam 10–20 mg 2-4ml of 5 mg/ml preparation (pre-anesthetic, induces sleep in 1–2 minutes).

Step 2: Lidocaine 40 mg 4ml of 1% preparation; pause to allow effect. (reduces possible burning in a peripheral vein due to Propofol).

Step 3: Propofol 1000 mg 100ml of 10 mg/ml preparation (loss of consciousness within 10 seconds, induces coma in 1–2 minutes; death may result from the Propofol but Rocuronium is always given.).

Step 4: Rocuronium 200 mg 20ml of 10 mg/ml preparation (cardiac arrest after Rocuronium injection usually occurs within 5 minutes of respiratory arrest).

Protocol Improvements
Canadian Association of MAiD Assessors and Providers recommends 3 main drugs to be used in euthanasia: Midazolam, Propofol and Rocuronium or Cisatracurium. Lidocaine and Bupivacaine are listed as optional drugs that can be used in addition to main drugs. Saline flushes between medications unnecessarily complicate the protocol. A saline flush may be considered following the administration of all medications when IV tubing of significant length and volume is employed.

Canada's law on euthanasia
Bill C-14, passed on 17 June 2016 in Canada's Parliament was the original legislation that legalized and regulated euthanasia. This legislation was amended by Bill C-7 in March 2021; it relaxed some of the safeguards for those whose death was not reasonably foreseeable and newly allowed those whose death was not reasonably foreseeable to access euthanasia.

This section outlines the details of this law. Strict rules govern access to euthanasia. If they are not met, anyone who aids another person in killing themselves is guilty of a crime.

Availability under the law
Under Canadian law, a person may access euthanasia only if they meet all of the following criteria:

(a) be eligible for health services funded by the federal government, or a province or territory (or during the applicable minimum period of residence or waiting period for eligibility);

(b) be at least 18 years old and mentally competent (capable of making health care decisions for yourself);

(c) have a grievous and irremediable medical condition;

(d) make a voluntary request for MAID that is not the result of outside pressure or influence; and

(e) give informed consent to receive MAID.

"Grievous and irremediable" medical condition
The law currently states that for a patient to have a grievous and irremediable medical condition eligible for assisted dying, they must meet all of the following criteria:

(a) they have a serious illness, disease or disability (excluding a mental illness until 17 March 2023);

(b) they be in an advanced state of decline that cannot be reversed; and

(c) they experience unbearable physical or mental suffering from the illness, disease, disability or state of decline that cannot be relieved under conditions that the patient considers acceptable.

When drafting the law in 2016, the last clause requiring death to be reasonably foreseeable had been controversial for how it narrowed the scope of the original Supreme Court of Canada ruling as it excluded most mental illnesses or long term disabilities, vastly limiting who may have access to the procedure.

Legal safeguards 

Canada's original medical assistance in dying law had what it calls "robust safeguards to prevent errors and abuse in the provision of medical assistance in dying." The drafters of the law argue they protect vulnerable persons from being induced, in moments of weakness, to end their lives."  Bill C-7's update to the law relaxes some of the safeguards for those whose death is reasonably foreseeable but retains or strengthens safeguards for those whose death is not reasonably foreseeable.

One independent witness
Any person who is at least 18 years of age and who understands the nature of the request can act as an independent witness, unless they:

(a) know or believe that they are a beneficiary under the will of the person making the request, or a recipient, in any other way, of a financial or other material benefit resulting from that person's death;

(b) are an owner or operator of any health care facility at which the person making the request is being treated or any facility in which that person resides;

(c) are directly involved in providing health care services to the person making the request; or

(d) directly provide personal care to the person making the request.

The original legislation required two independent witnesses to be present.

Two independent medical opinions
Two physicians or nurse practitioners involved must independently confirm via a written opinion both their agreement that a person has grievous and irremediable medical condition and their agreement that the patient is capable and willing of receiving euthanasia. The physicians or nurse practitioners making this determination must be independent, meaning that they:

(a) do not holds a position of authority over the other;

(b) could not knowingly benefit from the patient's death;

(c) is not connected to the other practitioner or to the person making the request in any other way that would affect their objectivity.

Signed written request 
Any person seeking euthanasia must submit a written and signed request made in the presence of one independent witness. This independent witness cannot benefit from the person's death, be an owner or operator of a health care facility where that patient receives care, or be an unpaid caregiver. If the person is not able to write, another independent adult can sign the request under the person's clear direction.

Express consent required right before death
A patient who chooses euthanasia can revoke their consent at any time, in any manner, without fear of consequence. In addition to this, the law also requires the patient to be informed repeatedly and clearly that at any time they have a right to refuse euthanasia.

Patients must again give express consent of their wish to receive euthanasia immediately before they receive it, and they must also be given an opportunity to withdraw the request immediately before the procedure is performed.

If a patient has difficulty communicating, before the procedure can be performed physicians must ensure that all necessary measures have been taken to ensure a reliable method of communicating with the patient exists, so that patients at all times can understand the information provided to them, and can adequately communicate any decision they make back.

Advance Directives 
While Canada's original medical assistance in dying law prohibited advance directives because of the law's strict insistence on express consent being present at all times, Bill C-7 allowed an exception for people whose deaths are reasonable foreseeable. Such advance directives could waive the final consent if they were signed if the following conditions were met while the patient had decision-making capacity:

(a) the patient was assessed and approved to receive euthanasia;

(b) the medial practitioner advised the patient that they were at risk of losing capacity to provide final consent; and

(c) the patient made a written arrangement with their medical practitioner in which they consented in advance to receive euthanasia on a specified date if they no longer have capacity to consent on that date.

Alternatively, final consent is not required if a person chooses to self-administer euthanasia.

Additional safeguards for those whose death is not reasonably foreseeable 
If a person seeks euthanasia but their death is not reasonably foreseeable, the following safeguards apply:

(a) one of the two practitioners who provides an assessment must have expertise in the medical condition that is causing the unbearable suffering;

(b) the person must be informed of available and appropriate means to relieve your suffering, including counselling services, mental health and disability support services, community services, and palliative care, and the person must be offered consultations with professionals who provide those services;

(c) the person and their practitioners must have discussed reasonable and available means to relieve their suffering and all agree that the person has seriously considered those means;

(d) the person's eligibility assessment must take a minimum of 90 days, unless the assessments have been completed sooner and the person is at immediate risk of losing their capacity to consent; and

(e) immediately before euthanasia is provided, the practitioner must give you an opportunity to withdraw your request and ensure that you give express consent to receive euthanasia.

Permissiveness of current law
As fewer than a dozen countries permit euthanasia in any form, Canada has one of the most permissive euthanasia laws in the world, although it does have various safeguards intended to prevent abuse. Canadian lawmakers said they closely studied the experience of other countries when deciding which aspects of euthanasia to allow, and which parts not to allow.

Canada's law is consistent with many other nations that allow euthanasia in requiring at least two physicians to confirm the details of a diagnosis. The signed request for euthanasia only requires the request to contain the signature of one independent witness, however.

Uniquely, Canada's law delegates the power of deciding medical eligibility for euthanasia to both physicians and nurse practitioners, a flexibility added in response to the concerns of rural areas who often struggle with having a shortage of doctors.

Canada's law is more restrictive than those of Belgium and the Netherlands in that it does not permit minors access to euthanasia. Canada will not allow euthanasia on the grounds of mental illness, a practice allowed in the Netherlands, Belgium, and Switzerland, until after 17 March 2023.

While Belgium allows advanced directives in all circumstances, such advance directives in Canada may only be used if the patient's death is reasonably foreseeable.

However, Canada's law no longer requires the presence of a terminal illness, like the Netherlands and Belgium's allowance of euthanasia for people suffering from a long-term disability.

In contrast to laws in many jurisdictions that only apply if there is a prognosis of death within 6 months, Canada's law left the definition of a reasonably foreseeable death to the judgment of individual medical practitioners.

In the instance of self administration, patients are prescribed the necessary medication for this service. The law also allows patients to request active assistance from practitioners,  in case they are physically unable to self administer this prescription.

Canada no longer requires a waiting period for those whose death is reasonably foreseeable, although a 90-day assessment period is required for those whose deaths are not reasonably foreseeable. The allowance to request and receive assistance on the very same day is much quicker than the jurisdictions in the United States that have legalized assisted suicide, where waiting periods are firmly fixed into law as legal requirements that must be met.

Legal history

Ciarlariello v. Schacter 
A 1993 decision made by the Supreme Court of Canada that established a patient's right to withdraw from a procedure that has already begun. Ms. Ciarlariello underwent two angiograms after experiencing bleeding in her brain. During the second procedure, she began to hyperventilate and asked the physician to stop the procedure. Nonetheless, the procedure was completed, and Ciarlariello experienced a severe reaction that left her quadriplegic.

Rodriguez v British Columbia

Until recently, the most prominent case opposing euthanasia was that of Sue Rodriguez, who after being diagnosed with amyotrophic lateral sclerosis (ALS) requested that the Canadian Supreme Court allow someone to aid her in ending her life. Her request appealed to the principle of autonomy and respect for every person, which states that "everyone has the right to self-determination subject only to an unjust infringement on the equal and competing rights of others".

Her main argument for euthanasia, however, appealed to the principle of equality and justice, which states that "everyone should be treated equally, and deviations from equality of treatment are permissible only to achieve equity and justice". The application of this principle to the case is as follows. Ms. Rodriguez's ALS would eventually lead her to lose her voluntary motor control. Therefore, this loss of motor control is a "handicap of ALS sufferers".

Because suicide is not a crime, it was argued that Ms. Rodriguez was being discriminated against in her option of deciding to commit suicide with the help of another person due to her disability, without the law "providing a compensatory and equitable relief". Though in 1992, the Court refused her request, two years later, Sue Rodriguez, with the help of an unknown doctor, ended her life despite the Court's decision. Due to her death, the Canadian medical profession issued a statement through Dr. Tom Perry and Dr. Peter Graff, who both said that they had assisted some of their patients in speeding up their death.

The Rodriguez case poses questions of the slippery slope argument. Sue Rodriguez argued that the Canadian government was violating her right to life, liberty and security of the person under section 7 of the Charter by robbing her of the freedom to end her life without assistance. Justice Sopinka stated that: "all persons who of the reason of disability are unable to commit suicide have a right to be free from government interference in procuring the assistance of others to take their life". However Justice McLachlin argued that: "our task was the much more modest one of determining whether, given the legislative scheme regulating suicide which Parliament has put in place, the denial to Sue Rodriguez of the ability to end her life is arbitrary and hence amounts to a limit on her security of the person which does not comport with the principles of fundamental justice". Chief Justice Lamer rejected this argument as a legal matter and stated: "While I share a deep concern over the subtle and overt pressures that may be brought to bear on such persons if assisted suicide is decriminalized, even in limited circumstances, I do not legalization that deprives a disadvantaged group of the right to equality can be justified solely on such speculative grounds, no matter how well-intentioned ... we simply do not and cannot know the range of implications that allowing some form of assisted suicide will have for persons with physical disabilities. What we do know and cannot ignore is the anguish of those in the position of Ms Rodriguez". The Chief Justice, however, did not recognize that Rodriguez was incapable of committing suicide and thus the court refused her request because the legal sanction of euthanasia did not constitute an active effort to restrict liberty and therefore, did not violate section 7 in that way.

R v Latimer
Robert Latimer is a Canadian canola and wheat farmer who was convicted of second-degree murder in the death of his daughter Tracy (23 November 1980 – 24 October 1993). This case sparked a national controversy on the definition and ethics of euthanasia as well as the rights of people with disabilities and two Supreme Court decisions: R. v. Latimer (1997), on section 10 of the Canadian Charter of Rights and Freedoms, and later R. v. Latimer (2001), on cruel and unusual punishments under section 12 of the Charter.

Bills C-407 and C-384 
In June 2005, Francine Lalonde introduced in Parliament a private Bill C-407 that would have legalized euthanasia in Canada, but the January 2006 election ended this bill. Lalonde was re-elected and reintroduced her bill to legalize euthanasia, which the 2008 election ended.

On 13 May 2009, Lalonde introduced another bill—Bill C-384—of the same nature as her other two attempts. The Bill was debated in the House of Commons, but died on 21 April 2010, in second reading House of Commons when the vote to advance Bill C-384 to the Justice and Human Rights committee failed 59 to 226. Nearly every member of the Bloc Québécois supported the legislation along with one independent and a handful of Liberal, New Democratic Party (NDP) and Conservative MPs. Every other MP either abstained or voted against the bill. Conservative Minister of Democratic Reform Steven Fletcher, who is Canada's first quadriplegic Member of Parliament and Cabinet Minister, made a public point of order after the vote to have an abstention recorded for the bill inviting for the discussion.

Quebec National Assembly
On 5 June 2014, Quebec became the first Canadian province to pass legislation legalizing euthanasia. The Government of Canada challenged this measure but in December 2015, the Quebec Court of Appeal confirmed that the euthanasia law would stand in the light of the Supreme Court decision in Carter v. Canada (Attorney General).

Carter v. Canada (Attorney General) decision 

On 15 June 2012, in a case filed by Gloria Taylor, the Supreme Court of British Columbia ruled that provisions in the Criminal Code prohibiting euthanasia were unconstitutional as they apply to severely disabled patients capable of giving consent. The lower court ruled that the Criminal Code provisions "infringe s. 7 [and s. 15 ] of the Charter, and are of no force and effect to the extent that they prohibit physician-assisted suicide by a medical practitioner in the context of a physician-patient relationship". Moreover, the court found that the relevant sections were legislatively overbroad, had a disproportionate effect on people with disabilities, and was "grossly disproportionate to the objectives it is meant to accomplish."

The case reached the Supreme Court of Canada in Carter v. Canada (Attorney General). The court ruled that the law banning euthanasia of terminally-ill patients (based on the Rodriguez v British Columbia (Attorney General) decision) was unconstitutional, and violated Section 7 of the Canadian Charter of Rights and Freedoms. The Supreme Court issued a 12-month suspended declaration of invalidity.

As a result of the decision, euthanasia was expected to be made legal for "a competent adult person who (1) clearly consents to the termination of life and (2) has a grievous and irremediable medical condition (including an illness, disease or disability) that causes enduring suffering that is intolerable to the individual in the circumstances of his or her condition".

The court decision includes a requirement that there must be stringent limits that are "scrupulously monitored". This will require the death certificate to be completed by an independent medical examiner, not the treating physician, to ensure the accuracy of reporting the cause of death.

Bill C-14

As required by the 2015 Supreme Court decision, Justice Minister Jody Wilson-Raybould tabled a bill in parliament in April 2016 to amend the Criminal Code to allow euthanasia. Bill C-14 "create[s] exemptions from the offences of culpable homicide, of aiding suicide and of administering a noxious thing, in order to permit medical practitioners and nurse practitioners to provide medical assistance in dying and to permit pharmacists and other persons to assist in the process". The bill will restrict euthanasia only to mentally competent adults with "enduring and intolerable suffering" and in cases where death is reasonably foreseeable. It also mandated a 10-day reflection period.

After the House of Commons passed Bill C-14 that would allow for euthanasia, it was debated in the Senate in mid-June 2016. Initially, that "chamber of sober second thought" amended the bill, expanding eligibility for euthanasia. However, when it became apparent that the elected House of Commons would not accept the amendment, a final vote was held on 18 June. At that time, a majority agreed with the restrictive wording provided by the House of Commons indicating that "only patients suffering from an incurable illness whose natural death is 'reasonably foreseeable' are eligible for a medically assisted death", as summarized by the Toronto Star. Some opponents to the law indicate that the Carter v. Canada (Attorney General) decision was broader, including desperately ill individuals and not only those who are terminally ill or near death. The House of Commons did accept a few Senate amendments, such as requiring that patients be counseled about alternatives including palliative care and barring beneficiaries from acting in the euthanasia. Senators such as Serge Joyal who disagree with the restrictive wording believe that the provinces should refer the issue to the Supreme Court of Canada for an opinion in order to preclude the need for individuals to proceed with such an Appeal and incur the significant expense of doing so.

There was also a debate on the issue of suicide in Indigenous communities with MP Robert-Falcon Ouellette (Liberal) voting against the government on C-14. This was the first instance of a government backbencher voting against their party. Ouellette felt that large-scale changes to social norms like euthanasia should move very slowly because the impacts will be felt differently across Canada and societies. "While the people of Toronto might want this, the impact in the North will be different. We are not islands unto ourselves."

Truchon v Attorney General of Canada 
On 11 September 2019, the Superior Court of Quebec declared that restricting euthanasia to those whose death is reasonably foreseeable violated the Charter's guarantee to "life, liberty, and security of the person" as well as the Charter's guarantee of "equal protection" under the law. The ruling declared the reasonably foreseeable clause in the federal euthanasia legislation to be unconstitutional, although the ruling only applied to Quebec. Neither the Attorney General of Canada or the Attorney General of Quebec appealed the decision as the federal government was prepared to introduce new euthanasia legislation to accommodate the ruling.

Bill C-7 

The federal government passed Bill C-7 on 17 March 2021. The new legislation relaxed or eliminated some of the safeguards for patients whose deaths were reasonably foreseeable, notably removing the 10-day waiting period, requiring only a single independent witness, and removing the requirement to offer palliative care. The legislation also introduced a new avenue for those whose death was not reasonably foreseeable to access euthanasia, conditional on the approval of medical practitioner who specialized in the underlying condition, a 90-day assessment period, and discussion on all other available treatment methods.

The legislation also included a sunset clause that would allow people with mental illness to be eligible for euthanasia two years after the legislation passed. This clause has been particularly controversial due to the percevied difficulty of receiving informed consent from individuals suffering from a mental illness, particularly when the mental illness is already associated with a suicidal ideation.

Statistics 
The number of euthanasia deaths across Canada has increased steadily since its full legalization in 2016, with euthanasia deaths accounting for 3.3% of all deaths in 2021. The majority (81%) of euthanasia requests are carried out.  The most common reasons that requests were not completed were because the patients died prior to receiving euthanasia (13.2%), the patients were deemed ineligible for euthanasia (4.0%), or the patients withdrew their request (1.9%). The average age of euthanasia recipients is 76.3 years of age, and the most common underlying condition cited for a euthanasia request was cancer.

Public Support and Opposition 
An Ipsos poll conducted in the spring of 2022 found that 86% of Canadians supported the Carter v Canada decision that led to the legalization of euthanasia. 82% supported the removal of the requirement that natural death be reasonably foreseeable.

A poll conducted by Leger in the summer of 2022 regarding further liberalization of Canada's euthanasia laws found that 51% of Canadians supported expanding euthanasia to mature minors, with 23% opposed and 26% being unsure. 65% supported advanced directives in the face of a worsening cognitive condition, with 14% opposed and 22% being unsure. 45% supported expanding eligibility for euthanasia to include individuals with serious mental health illnesses, with 23% opposed and 32% being unsure of their position.

Professional support and opposition

Quebec College of Physicians
Before euthanasia was made legal in Quebec in June 2014, the Quebec College of Physicians had declared that it was prepared to cross the line on the debate over euthanasia and proposed that it be included as part of the appropriate care in certain particular circumstances.

Canadian Medical Association 
The Canadian Medical Association (CMA) describes euthanasia as "one of the most complex and ethically challenging issues facing Canadian physicians".

Before the February 2015 Supreme Court of Canada decision, the Canadian Medical Association had maintained that it is not up to them to decide on the issue of euthanasia, but the responsibility of society. Though in 1995, the Canadian Senate Committee decided that euthanasia should remain illegal, they recommended that a new category of crime be specifically created for those charged with assisting in suicide, called "compassionate suicide".

The Canadian Medical Association reported that not all doctors were willing to help a terminally-ill patient die. A 2015 survey indicated that 29% of Canadian doctors surveyed would consider providing euthanasia while 63% would refuse. However, the belief in late 2015 was that no physician would be forced to do so. The extent of conscientious objection to providing euthanasia continues to be debated on issues such as whether objecting physicians must refer patients to a doctor who is willing to provide euthanasia and whether institutions have a right to refuse to provide euthanasia services.

The CMA also supported the request to the Supreme Court for a six-month extension, said CMA spokesman Dr. Jeff Blackmer, in order to develop educational materials and to train numerous physicians across Canada. However, by late 2015, the CMA had begun to offer educational sessions to members as to the process that would be used.

Controversy

Canada's practice of euthanasia has received significant attention worldwide because of its permissive scope and because of reported abuse of the system.

In 2021, the United Nations Human Rights Council's special rapporteur on the rights of persons with disabilities criticized Bill C-7, which expanded eligibility for euthanasia, for undermining the autonomy of people with disabilities.

In February 2022, an anonymous Toronotonian with the pseudonym Sophia had a medically assisted death after failing to find affordable housing.

In November 2022, an anonymous active Canadian Forces member has alleged he was offered MAID when seeking assistance regarding PTSD and suicidal thoughts, raising concern about MAID being inappropriately offered. In December 2022, Paralympian and veteran Christine Gauthier testified that a Veterans Affairs Canada employee offered her MAID as an option when she is fighting for installing a wheelchair lift or ramp at her house. This has led to a national controversy, with Prime minister Justin Trudeau called the report "absolutely unacceptable". Subsequently, VA claimed they found no record that MAID has been offered as an option to Gauthier and only found four such cases, all involving a single now-suspended case manager.

In December 2022, Canadian writer Alexander Raikin revealed that the Canadian Association of MAID Assessors and Providers (CAMAP) has organized training seminars on patients who sought MAiD due to socio-economic factors such as poverty and loneliness, cases CAMAP denied could occur under the Canadian system.

See also
 Euthanasia Prevention Coalition
 Maurice Généreux
 Gloria Taylor
 R. v. Latimer
 Suicide legislation

References

External links 
 Assisted Suicide and Canadian Law on LegalEase CKUT 90.3 FM Montreal
 CBC Radio Interview about providing physician-assisted death Canadian Broadcasting Corporation
 Solace Canadian physician who provides Medical assistance in dying
 

 
Law of Canada
Suicide in Canada
Death in Canada